A Matter of Choice is a 1963 British drama film directed by Vernon Sewell and starring Anthony Steel, Jeanne Moody and Ballard Berkeley. The screenplay concerns two youths who accidentally kill a man.

It was one of a number of low budget British films Steel made in the 1960s while based in Rome.

Cast
 Anthony Steel - John Crighton
 Jeanne Moody - Lisa Grant
 Ballard Berkeley - Charles Grant
 Malcolm Gerard - Mike
 Michael Davis - Tony
 Penny Morrell - Jackie
 Lisa Peake - Jane
 James Bree - Alfred
 George Moon - Spike
 Richard Bebb as Waiter
 Garard Green as Shop Keeper
 Frank Pettitt as Police Sergeant
 Frank Shelley	as Police Doctor

References

External links

1963 films
1963 drama films
Films directed by Vernon Sewell
British drama films
1960s English-language films
1960s British films